Roger Anthony Lemke (born October 7, 1970) is a Canadian television and film actor, best known for portraying Three (Marcus Boone / Titch) on Syfy's science-fiction drama Dark Matter.

In French Canada, Lemke is best known for playing David Rothstein on Radio Canada's comedy-drama Les Hauts et les bas de Sophie Paquin.

Early life and education 
Anthony Lemke was born in Ottawa, Ontario. He is the child of immigrants, his parents having arrived from the Netherlands and East Prussia in the early 1960s. Lemke attended elementary and high school in French under the immersion programs at Knoxdale Public School, Greenbank Middle School, and Sir Robert Borden High School in Nepean.

Upon graduation, Lemke moved to Waterloo, Ontario to study theatre at the University of Waterloo. Lemke also holds degrees in both common law and civil law, having graduated from the McGill University Faculty of Law with Distinction.

Career
Lemke landed his first professional role in a production of the play Nurse Jane Goes to Hawaii by the Canadian playwright Allan Stratton at what is now the King's Wharf Theatre. His first role in a TV series followed shortly thereafter when he was cast in La Femme Nikita. He got the role largely because he could speak Czech from the year he spent teaching English in the Czech Republic.

In 2000 Lemke landed the role of the mustachio-twirling mercenary Captain Grisham on the fantasy-genre series The Queen of Swords, which Variety Magazine declared a "guilty pleasure". He also played James Murphy, the son of Alex Murphy (aka RoboCop), in RoboCop: Prime Directives, a four-part mini-series that aired in 2001.

In 2003 Lemke enrolled in law school at the McGill University in Montreal, during which time he continued to act, including regular roles on the Montreal-shot series 15/Love (season 3) and CBC Television's Rumours. He also portrayed Rob Smith in A Life Interrupted, which was nominated for the Best TV Movie at the 2008 Gemini Awards.

Since returning full-time to acting after law school, Lemke has a deep collection of credits to his name in both English and French. In 2008 he joined the cast of Radio Canada's comedy-drama Les Hauts et les bas de Sophie Paquin, playing David Rothstein, a character that Montreal newspaper La Presse numbers among the few anglophone characters to ever "mark the soul" of Quebecers. He followed up in French with recurring roles on Mémoires Vives, Mirador, Nouvelle Adresse, all of which are Gémeaux Award nominated TV series.

In 2011, he joined the casts of Lost Girl and Montreal-shot Blue Mountain State for multiple-episode arcs. The same year, Lemke took on the part of Le Vulgaire in the bi-lingual film Rouge Sang; the film garnered 3 Canadian Screen Award nominations.

In 2014, Lemke reprised his role of Brian Becker for the fifth season of  CTV and Fox International's The Listener, a role he had played during season 1. Lemke also began a 7-episode run over two seasons on Bravo's police drama 19-2 as SQ Officer Dan Malloy. The series received 10 Canadian Screen Award nominations, including best dramatic series. Also in 2014, Lemke was cast in the role of "Three" (aka. Marcus Boone) in the science fiction television series Dark Matter. The series shot 39 episodes over three seasons from 2015 to 2017. Lemke appeared in all 39 episodes.

Personal life
Lemke married classical musician Maria Gacesa in 2001, when the couple were living in Toronto. They have lived most of their lives since in Montreal, where the couple's three children were born. From 2014 to 2018, Lemke and his family lived in Prince Edward County, Ontario.

Filmography

Film

Television

Video games

References

External links
 

Living people
1962 births
Canadian male film actors
Canadian male television actors
Canadian male voice actors
Male actors from Montreal
Male actors from Ottawa
Canadian people of Dutch descent
Canadian people of Prussian descent
McGill University Faculty of Law alumni